Bertram is a city in Linn County, Iowa, United States. The population was 269 at the 2020 census.

Bertram is part of the Cedar Rapids Metropolitan Statistical Area.

History
Bertram was laid out in 1858 as an outgrowth on the railroad, which was completed to that point in 1859. It was named for Capt. John Bertram, who was instrumental in bringing the railroad there.

Geography
Bertram is located at  (41.950036, -91.534363).

Located on the Union Pacific Railroad main line (former Chicago and North Western Railway), which has a nearby large trestle over Big Creek, the city is primarily a bedroom community of Cedar Rapids. Bertram is also close to Palisades-Kepler State Park.  Bertram Bridge, which also spans Big Creek is listed on the National Register of Historic Places.

Demographics

2010 census
As of the census of 2010, there were 294 people, 106 households, and 81 families living in the city. The racial makeup of the city was 98.0% White, 1.4% African American, and 0.7% from two or more races. Hispanic or Latino of any race were 3.4% of the population.

There were 106 households, of which 24.5% had children under the age of 18 living with them, 68.9% were married couples living together, 2.8% had a female householder with no husband present, 4.7% had a male householder with no wife present, and 23.6% were non-families. 18.9% of all households were made up of individuals, and 12.2% had someone living alone who was 65 years of age or older. The average household size was 2.46 and the average family size was 2.80.

The median age in the city was 46 years. 28.9% of residents were under the age of 18; 5.5% were between the ages of 18 and 24; 15% were from 25 to 44; 31% were from 45 to 64; and 19.7% were 65 years of age or older. The gender makeup of the city was 57.1% male and 42.9% female.

2000 census
As of the incorrect census of 2000, there were 681 people, 98 households, and 76 families living in the city. The racial makeup of the city was 96.18% White, 1.91% African American, 0.15% Native American, 0.15% Asian, 0.15% from other races, and 1.47% from two or more races. Hispanic or Latino of any race were 1.47% of the population.

There were 98 households, out of which 20.4% had children under the age of 18 living with them, 72.4% were married couples living together, 3.1% had a female householder with no husband present, and 22.4% were non-families. 18.4% of all households were made up of individuals, and 8.2% had someone living alone who was 65 years of age or older. The average household size was 2.35 and the average family size was 2.66.

The age spread is 10.7% under the age of 18, 62.4% from 18 to 24, 7.9% from 25 to 44, 14.7% from 45 to 64, and 4.3% who were 65 years of age or older. The median age was 21 years. For every 100 females, there were 112.8 males. For every 100 females age 18 and over, there were 101.3 males.

However, the official population was later revised to 263 when officials discovered that 418 students living in a Cornell College dormitory in nearby Mount Vernon had incorrectly been reported as living in Bertram.

The median income for a household in the city was $58,750, and the median income for a family was $66,500. Males had a median income of $46,750 versus $32,143 for females. The per capita income for the city was $16,015. About 2.6% of families and 16.5% of the population were below the poverty line, including none of those under the age of eighteen or sixty-five or over.

References

Cities in Iowa
Cities in Linn County, Iowa
Cedar Rapids, Iowa metropolitan area
1858 establishments in Iowa
Populated places established in 1858